is an aerospace museum of the Japan Air Self-Defense Force in the city of Kanoya, Kagoshima Prefecture, Japan. The museum is located adjacent to Kanoya Air Field.

History
The museum opened in December 1973 (Showa 48) and reopened in July 1993 as the “New Historical Museum”. By exhibiting photographs, documents, and actual equipment (restored) from the days of the Imperial Japanese Navy Kanoya Air Base to the modern Maritime Self-Defense Force, the actual situation of the war and the Japanese Special Attack Units, the transition and activities of the equipment of the modern Maritime Self-Defense Force. It is intended that the meaning of protecting Japan will be understood by clarifying such things. The number of stored materials is about 5,500.

Aircraft on display

 Shin Meiwa US-1A
 Kawasaki P-2J
 Grumman S2F-1
 B-65
 Bell 47
 HSS-2A
 P2V-7
 OH-6D
 V-107
 SNB
 R4D-6
 Beechcraft T-34 Mentor
 Fuji KM-2
 The world's last original Kawanishi H8K type 2 Nishiki Ogata Hikotei

References

External links

Kagoshima Sightseeing Guide

Museums in Kagoshima Prefecture
Aerospace museums in Japan
Prefectural museums
Kanoya, Kagoshima
Museums established in 1973
1973 establishments in Japan